Fu Hao (April 13, 1916 – June 17, 2016), original name Fu Zhongxiao, was a Chinese diplomat and vice-minister of the Ministry of Foreign Affairs of the People's Republic of China. He was born in Liquan County, Xianyang, Shaanxi. He was Ambassador of the People's Republic of China to North Vietnam (1974–1976), Vietnam (1976–1977) and Japan (1977–1982). He was a member of the Standing Committee of the 6th National People's Congress (1983–1988) and 7th National People's Congress (1988–1993). He was a graduate of the Beijing Foreign Studies University and Counter-Japanese Military and Political University.

References

Ambassadors of China to Japan
Ambassadors of China to Vietnam
Members of the Standing Committee of the 6th National People's Congress
Members of the Standing Committee of the 7th National People's Congress
Vice-ministers of the Ministry of Foreign Affairs of the People's Republic of China
Beijing Foreign Studies University alumni
Counter-Japanese Military and Political University alumni
Politicians from Xianyang
People's Republic of China politicians from Shaanxi

1916 births

2016 deaths
Chinese centenarians
Men centenarians